City Slang is an independent record label based in Berlin, Germany.

History
The label was founded in 1990 by former tour agent Christof Ellinghaus, exclusively to release The Flaming Lips' In A Priest Driven Ambulance (With Silver Sunshine Stares). With bands The Lemonheads, Das Damen, and Yo La Tengo also looking for a label to release their 1990 albums, City Slang became, almost by chance, a home for US bands looking to bring their music to the European market.

It was named after the song "City Slang" by Sonic's Rendezvous Band.

Over the past 22 years, City Slang has played host to releases ranging from veteran acts to newcomers. Its focus on US- and Canada-based acts remains, maintaining its relationship with several key North American independent labels, such as Merge Records and Arts & Crafts.

Artists

 Alexi Murdoch
 Anna Von Hausswolff
 Arcade Fire
 Bayonne
 Benjamin Gibbard
 Broken Social Scene
 CocoRosie
 Caribou
 Calexico
 Cortney Tidwell
 Dan Mangan
  Das Damen
 Dear Reader
 Efterklang
 Eight Frozen Modules
 EMA
 Get Well Soon
 Goldrush
 Health
 Herman Dune
 Imarhan
 Jakuzi
 Junip
 Junior Boys
 Kevin Drew
 King Hannah
 Lackthereof
 Lambchop
 Laura Gibson
 Malajube
 Menomena
 Nada Surf
 Noga Erez
 O'Death
 On An On
 Pom Pom Squad
 Port O'Brien 
 Roosevelt
 Schneider TM
 Sebadoh
 Sinkane
 Son Lux
 Sophia
 Stars
 The Lemonheads
 The Notwist
 The Album Leaf
 Tindersticks
 To Rococo Rot
 Unsane
 White Denim
 Wye Oak
 Yo La Tengo

See also
 List of record labels

References

External links

Record labels established in 1991
German independent record labels
Indie rock record labels
Indie pop record labels
1991 establishments in Germany